Nyctemera adversata, the marbled white moth, is a moth of the family Erebidae first described by Johann Gottlieb Schaller in 1788. It is found in Sri Lanka, Bangladesh, India, Nepal, Myanmar, China territories like Tibet, Sichuan, Yunnan, Guangdong, Hong Kong, Hainan, Guangxi, Hunan, Henan, Zhejiang, Jiangxi, Fujian, Taiwan, Japan (northern part of Honshu Island), Peninsular Malaysia, Thailand, Indonesia (Sumatra, Java and Borneo) Philippines.

Nyctemera adversata is a day-flying species.

The larvae feed on Erechtites, Erigeron, Gynura, Picris, and Senecio species.

References

External links

Nyctemerina
Moths of Japan
Moths described in 1788